Angel Eyes may refer to:

Film and television
 Angel Eyes (film), a 2001 American romantic drama
 Angel Eyes, a character in the 1966 film The Good, the Bad and the Ugly
 Angel Eyes (TV series), a 2014 South Korean TV series
 "Angel Eyes" (Taggart), a television episode

Music

Albums
 Angel Eyes (Dave Brubeck album), 1964
 Angel Eyes (Duke Pearson album), 1968
 Angel Eyes (Gene Ammons album), 1965
 Angel Eyes (Joe Bonner album), 1976
 Angel Eyes (Kiki Dee album), 1987
 Angel Eyes (Stanley Cowell album), 1994
 Angel Eyes (Willie Nelson album), 1984
 Angel Eyes: Ballads & Slow Jams, by Jimmy Smith, 1996
 Angel Eyes (EP) or the title song, by Riot, 1997
 Angel Eyes, by Tamara Walker, 2002

Songs
 "Angel Eyes" (1946 song), a jazz standard written by Earl Brent and Matt Dennis
 "Angel Eyes" (The Jeff Healey Band song), 1989; covered by Paulini, 2004
 "Angel Eyes" (Jerry Cantrell song), 2002
 "Angel Eyes" (Lime song), 1983
 "Angel Eyes" (Love and Theft song), 2011
 "Angel Eyes" (Raghav song), 2005
 "Angel Eyes" (Roxy Music song), 1979
 "Angel Eyes (Home and Away)", by Wet Wet Wet, 1987
 "Angeleyes", by ABBA, 1979
 "I'll Never Let You Go (Angel Eyes)", by Steelheart, 1990
 "Angel Eyes", by Ace of Base from The Bridge, 1995
 "Angel Eyes", by Axel Rudi Pell from Tales of the Crown, 2008
 "Angel Eyes", by Fair Control
 "Angel Eyes", by Heartsdales, 2005
 "Angel Eyes", by Jim Brickman, 1994
 "Angel Eyes", by m.o.v.e from Grid, 2006
 "Angel Eyes", by New Years Day from Victim to Villain, 2013
 "Pretty Little Angel Eyes", by Curtis Lee, 1961

Other 
 Angel Eyes (novel), a 1981 novel by Loren D. Estleman
 Angel Eyes, a 1991 novel by Eric Van Lustbader
 Halo headlights or angel eyes, a type of automotive front lighting